Villánykövesd is a wine-village in Baranya county, Hungary, established 1730 by German Settlers.
Until the end of World War II, the Inhabitants was all Roman Catholic Danube Swabians (Schwowe), also called locally as Stifulder, because the majority of there Ancestors once came at the 17th century and 18th century from Fulda (district). Mostly of the former German Settlers was expelled to Allied-occupied Germany and Allied-occupied Austria in 1945–1948, about the Potsdam Agreement.

References

Populated places in Baranya County